Marie-Emile Xavier Daufresne de La Chevalerie (28 January 1920 – 21 August 2004) was a French diplomat. From 1967 to 1969 he served as Chief of Staff to the President of France, Charles de Gaulle.

Biography
Xavier de La Chevalerie was born in Paris on 28 January 1920 to Alyette (née de Beaulaincourt-Marles) and Christian Daufresne de La Chevalerie. He studied at the Lycée Saint-Louis-de-Gonzague in Paris and then at the University of Paris in the faculties of literature and law. After further studies at the École Libre des Sciences Politiques, he began his career shortly before the outbreak of World War II. In 1940 he joined the Free French Forces and served under General Philippe Leclerc in Africa. He subsequently served as a diplomatic aide at the French embassy in the United States when it re-opened in 1944 following the liberation of France.

After the war, he served in a variety of diplomatic posts, primarily in North Africa, Asia, and the Levant. He and his cousin, Xavier de Beaulaincourt-Marles, who had served as Charles de Gaulle's private secretary since 1948, were part of de Gaulle's close entourage during the period of the so-called politics of grandeur (1960-1968).

In 1967, he was named Chief of Staff to President de Gaulle and served in that post until 1969 when de Gaulle resigned from office.

Shortly after de Gaulle's resignation in 1969, de La Chevalerie was appointed ambassador to Mexico and resumed his diplomatic career. He subsequently served as France's ambassador to Gambia (1973-1977), Guinea-Bissau (1975-1977), Senegal (1975-1977), Canada (1977-1979), Japan (1979-1982), and the  Vatican (1983-1985).

De La Chevalerie was married to Marie-France (née Hislaire), the daughter of the Belgian journalist and writer, René Hislaire. The couple had seven children. Xavier de La Chevalerie died on 21 August 2004 in Saint Nazaire. His wife pre-deceased him in 1985.

Notes and references

Sources
Andrews, William (1982). Presidential Government in Gaullist France: A Study of Executive-Legislative Relations, 1958-1974. SUNY Press. 
Chiaradia, Éric (2011). L'entourage du général de Gaulle: juin 1958-avril 1969. Editions Publibook.  
Lafitte, Jacques and Taylor, Stephen (eds.) (1997). "Daufresne de La Chevalerie (Xavier, Marie-Emile)". Who's Who in France, p. 533. J. Lafitte.  
Ministère des affaires étrangères. (2008). Documents diplomatiques français: 1967. (Vol. 2: 1 July 29 December). Peter Lang.  
New York Times (23 September 1944). "French Embassy in U.S. Reopened; Tricolor Hoisted on Building Closed Since the Rupture With Vichy in 1942" 
New York Times (23 February 1945). "Miss Marie-France Hislaire Is Affianced To Xavier de la Chevalerie, French Aide" 
New York Times (24 August 1951). "Rene Hislaire, Editor for Many Years, Dies". 
Further reading
De La Chevalerie, Xavier (1997). "Le voyage du général de Gaulle au Québec en 1967", Espoir, No. 112 
De La Chevalerie, Xavier (1998). "Les journées de Mai 1968 à l'Élysée et leur épilogue, Espoir, No. 115  
Ross, André (2005). "Xavier de La Chevalerie", Espoir, No. 143, pp. 156–158 

20th-century French diplomats
Free French Forces
1920 births
2004 deaths
Ambassadors of France to Mexico
Ambassadors of France to the Gambia
Ambassadors of France to Guinea-Bissau
Ambassadors of France to Senegal
Ambassadors of France to Canada
Ambassadors of France to Japan
Ambassadors of France to the Holy See
Ambassadors of France to Cape Verde
French expatriates in the United States